An ethnolinguistic group (or ethno-linguistic group) is a group that is unified by both a common ethnicity and language. Most ethnic groups share a first language. However, "ethnolinguistic" is often used to emphasise that language is a major basis for the ethnic group, especially in regard to its neighbours.

A central concept in the linguistic study of ethnolinguistic groups is ethnolinguistic vitality, the ability of the group's language and ethnicity to sustain themselves. An ethnolinguistic group that lacks such vitality is unlikely to survive as a distinct entity. Factors that influence the ethnolinguistic vitality are demographics, institutional control and status (including language planning factors).

See also

First language
Ethnolinguistics
Ethnoreligious group
Nation state
Race (human classification)
Regionalism (politics)

References

Further reading

Sachdev, Itesh, and Richard Y. Bourhis. "Language and social identification". Social identity theory: Constructive and critical advances 211 (1990): 229.
Giles, Howard, Richard Y. Bourhis, and Donald M. Taylor. "Towards a theory of language in ethnic group relations". Language, ethnicity and intergroup relations, 307348 (1977).
Bourhis, Richard Y. "Language in ethnic interaction: A social psychological approach." Language and ethnic relations (1979): 117–141.

Sociology of language
Ethnicity
Ethnology